Nienke Hommes (born 20 February 1977 in Haarlem) is a Dutch rower.

References 
 
 

1977 births
Living people
Dutch female rowers
Sportspeople from Haarlem
Rowers at the 2004 Summer Olympics
Olympic bronze medalists for the Netherlands
Olympic rowers of the Netherlands
Olympic medalists in rowing
World Rowing Championships medalists for the Netherlands
Medalists at the 2004 Summer Olympics
20th-century Dutch women
21st-century Dutch women